The Barn at 4277 Irish Road in Davison, Michigan is a round barn built from concrete block with a round gambrel roof containing a gable dormer.  It was built by farmer Erwin Gabel in the early twentieth century. It has a number of doors and windows around the circumference.

References

Agricultural buildings and structures on the National Register of Historic Places in Michigan
Round barns in Michigan
Buildings and structures in Genesee County, Michigan
National Register of Historic Places in Genesee County, Michigan